Oyinbo is an early Yoruba word used to refer to Caucasians. In the 1470s, the first Portuguese birth occurred in Eko, in Yorubaland, later called Lagos. The word was first used by the Yoruba to describe the Portuguese. It would later extend to all Europeans. Many years later, the word became used for anyone influenced by European tradition, customs, and culture, especially once-enslaved returnees. Oyinbo is generally used to refer to a person of European descent, Africans perceived to be not culturally Yoruba, or to people of any race considered light-skinned. The word is generally understood by most Nigerians and many other Africans.

Etymology
The word is coined from the Yoruba translation of “peeled skin,” "lightened," or “skinless,” which, in Yoruba, translates “yin” – to scratch “bo” – to off/peel/lightened. the "O" starting the word "Oyinbo" is a pronoun. Hence, "Oyinbo" translates literally to "the person with a peeled-off or lightened skin". Other variations of the term in the Yoruba language include Eyinbo, which is shortened to "Eebo".

Oyinbo is also used in reference to people who are foreign or Europeanised, including Saros in the Igbo towns of Onitsha and Enugu in the late 19th and early 20th century. Sierra Leonean missionaries, according to Ajayi Crowther, a Yoruba, and John Taylor, an Igbo, descendants of repatriated slaves, were referred to as oyibo ojii or "native foreigners" by the people of Onitsha in the late 19th century.

Olaudah Equiano, an African abolitionist, claimed in his 1789 narrative that the people in Essaka, Igboland, where he claimed to be from, used the term Oye-Eboe in reference to "red men living at a distance" which may possibly be an earlier version of oyibo. Equiano's use of Oye-Eboe, however, was in reference to other Africans and not Caucasians. Gloria Chuku suggested that Equiano's use of Oye-Eboe is not linked to oyibo, and that it is a reference to the generic term Onitsha and other more western Igbo people referred to other Igbo people. R. A. K. Oldfield, a European, while on the Niger River near Aboh in 1832 had recorded locals calling out to him and his entourage "Oh, Eboe! Oh, Eboe!", and linked to modern 'oyibo'.

Related
In Central and West Africa the name for a person of European descent is Toubab.

In Ghana the word used for a 'white' person or foreigner is 'Obroni' in the local languages, those of the Akan family.

References

Nigerian culture
African people of European descent
European diaspora in Africa
Yoruba words and phrases